Crash and Burn is a 1990 American science fiction film directed by Charles Band. It was originally titled Robot Jox 2: Crash and Burn in most European markets, despite not being related to Band's 1990 film Robot Jox.

Plot
Unicom is a powerful organization overseeing most of the world after its economic collapse. They have banned computers and robots in an attempt to ensure "life, liberty, and the pursuit of economic stability." When a Unicom Synth robot infiltrates a southwest TV station and kills the manager, a revolutionary against the gestapo-like corporation, a lowly Unicom delivery man, must help the rest of the station survive through the incoming "thermal storm."

Cast
Paul Ganus as Tyson Keen
Megan Ward as Arren
Jack McGee as Winston Wickett
Eva LaRue as Parice
Bill Moseley as Quinn

Release
Crash and Burn was officially titled Robot Jox 2 in most European markets at the time of release, but renamed when re-released on DVD. Despite the title, same opening theme, and involvement of Charles Band, and reused cover art, the plots of Robot Jox 2: Crash and Burn and Robot Jox are completely unrelated.

The film was released on DVD by Full Moon in 2000, but was discontinued for copyright reasons. The DVD contained a widescreen print of the film. The film was later released onto DVD again through the Charles Band DVD Collection, released in 2006. The boxset also contains Meridian: Kiss of the Beast, Doctor Mordrid, and Head of the Family. The film was again released on DVD by Shout! Factory on June 14, 2011, as a double feature DVD with Robot Wars.

See also
Robot Wars - a 1993 film also marketed as a sequel to Robot Jox

External links

1990 animated films
1990 films
1990 science fiction films
American robot films
American science fiction action films
American dystopian films
Films directed by Charles Band
Films set in the 2030s
Films shot in California
Full Moon Features films
American independent films
American post-apocalyptic films
Films using stop-motion animation
Films scored by Richard Band
1990s English-language films
1990s American films